Malika Samatovna Abdullahodjaeva (28 November 1932 - 26 June 2018) was a Soviet and Uzbek pathologist, a full member of the Academy of Sciences of Uzbekistan, Hero of Uzbekistan (2006).

Early life and education 
Malika Abdullahodjaeva was born on 28 November 1932 in Moscow in a family of students of the Communist University of the Toilers of the East.

Abdullahodjaeva graduated from Tashkent secondary school No. 110 in 1950 with a golden medal, the medical faculty of the Tashkent State Medical Institute (TashGosMI) (1956, with honors), and postgraduate studies at the Brain Institute of the USSR Academy of Medical Sciences (laboratory of histochemistry) in 1960. On December 27, 1960, she defended her dissertation for the Candidate of Medical Sciences degree at the Academic Council of the Medical and Biological Department of the USSR Academy of Medical Sciences.  

In 1968, Abdullahodjaeva defended her doctoral dissertation. In 1970 she was approved as a professor.

Career 
Abdullahodjaeva worked at the Tashkent State Medical Institute, from 1963 till 1969 she simultaneously headed the pathomorphological department with the histochemistry laboratory at the Research Institute of Radiology, Radiology, and Oncology of the Ministry of Health of the Uzbek SSR. 

Since 1969 Abdullahodjaeva was a head of Department of Pathological Anatomy, Tashkent State Medical Institute. In 1990, after the institute's division, she headed the Department of Pathological Anatomy of the Second TashMI, which she led until 2000.

From 1972 to 1997, Abdullahodjaeva was the chief pathologist of the Ministry of Health of the Republic of Uzbekistan.

In 1995, she was elected a corresponding member, and in 2000 a full member (academician) of the Academy of Sciences of Uzbekistan.

Abdullahodjaeva is an author of many guidelines and manuals, including for foreign students, and an atlas for students of the Faculty of Dentistry. In 1997-1999 Abdullahodjaeva published the first Uzbek two-volume textbook for 3rd-year students of medical universities Fundamentals of Human Pathology.

Malika Abdullahodjaeva died on 26 June 2018.

Awards and honors 
Abdullahodjaeva is an Honored Scientist of the Uzbek SSR (1980). She was awarded the Medal "For Labour Valour" (1970), the Order of the Badge of Honor (1976), Medal "Veteran of Labor" (1984), Medal "Oliy Talim A'lochisi" (2000), the Order "Mekhnat Shukhrati" (2003). In 2006 he was awarded the title of "Uzbekiston Qahramoni" ("Hero of Uzbekistan") with the award of the "Gold Star".

References 

1932 births
2018 deaths
Uzbekistani women scientists
Soviet pathologists
Women pathologists
Scientists from Moscow